For beta-glucuronidase, see Beta-glucuronidase

In enzymology, an alpha-glucuronidase is an enzyme that catalyzes the chemical reaction

an alpha-D-glucuronoside + H2O  an alcohol + D-glucuronate

Thus, the two substrates of this enzyme are alpha-D-glucuronoside and H2O, whereas its two products are alcohol and D-glucuronate.

This enzyme belongs to the family of hydrolases, to be specific those glycosidases that hydrolyse O- and S-glycosyl compounds.  The systematic name of this enzyme class is alpha-D-glucosiduronate glucuronohydrolase. This enzyme is also called alpha-glucosiduronase.

Structural studies

See also
Beta-glucuronidase
Glucuronosyl-disulfoglucosamine glucuronidase
Glycyrrhizinate beta-glucuronidase

References

 Visser, J., Kusters van Someren, M.A., Beldman, G. and Voragen, A.G.J. (Eds.), Xylans and Xylanases, Elsevier, Amsterdam, 1992, p. 213-224.
 

EC 3.2.1
Enzymes of known structure